Igor Lazić (born 30 October 1979) is a Slovenian former football defender. He has been capped for the Slovenian national team.

References

1979 births
Living people
Slovenian footballers
Slovenia international footballers
Association football defenders
FC Akhmat Grozny players
Russian Premier League players
Slovenian expatriate footballers
Expatriate footballers in Russia
Slovenian expatriate sportspeople in Austria
Slovenian expatriate sportspeople in Russia
Slovenian PrvaLiga players
Expatriate footballers in Austria
NK Olimpija Ljubljana (1945–2005) players
NK Olimpija Ljubljana (2005) players
NK IB 1975 Ljubljana players
NK Celje players
NK Nafta Lendava players